Mission Pictures International (MPI) is a foreign sales, finance, and distribution company specializing in family and faith-based entertainment for mainstream audiences worldwide.

Since Mission’s inception in 2008 CEO/Founder Cindy Bond has been committed to expanding upon its brand of entertaining and life-affirming feature film and television programming, and has produced over 200 films. Headquartered in Calabasas, California, MPI annually exhibits at all major film and TV markets, including NATPE, Berlin, Filmart (HKTDC), MIP-TV, The Marche Du Film in Cannes, MIPCOM and AFM. Mission’s productions include Hallmark Channel’s Enchanted Christmas starring Alexa and Carlos PenaVega and the independent feature film I Can Only Imagine starring Dennis Quaid, which was released through Lionsgate/Roadside Attractions on March 16, 2018. I Can Only Imagine shattered industry box office predictions to take the #3 spot at the U.S. box office in its first 2 weeks of release. I Can Only Imagine grossed over $83 million to date in domestic ticket sales, a rare A+ Cinemascore, and become the #3 Music Biopic and #6 Christian Film in modern-day history.

History
Mission Pictures International was founded in 2008 by entertainment industry veterans Cindy Bond and Chevonne O'Shaughnessy.

The company specializes in distributing family friendly films such as Like Dandelion Dust, based on the Karen Kingsbury novel, and starring Academy Award winner Mira Sorvino and Barry Pepper.

In 2011 MPI picked up foreign rights for the Hallmark Channel original movie The Shunning, starring Danielle Panabaker, as well as two new feature films, The 5th Quarter, starring Aidan Quinn and Andie MacDowell, and Seven Days in Utopia, starring Robert Duvall.

The company maintains offices in Studio City and Van Nuys, California, USA.

Films distributed by MPI

References

External links
 

Mass media companies established in 2008
Film distributors of the United States
Film production companies of the United States
Companies based in Los Angeles County, California
American companies established in 2008